Benjamin Cima (born March 20, 1996) is an American rugby union player who plays fly-half for the United States men's national team. Cima also plays for the Seattle Seawolves in Major League Rugby (MLR).

Cima formerly played club rugby for Rocky Gorge and also played at the international level for the United States men's national under-20 team and the USA Selects.

Early life
Ben Cima was born in Argentina, the son of former La Salle rugby player, Marcelo Cima. At the age of seven, Cima moved to the United States. Cima was named an All-American in rugby during each of his final three years in high school, and in 2014 led Gonzaga College to its first national championship in rugby at the High School National Invitational tournament.

Club career
Following his high school graduation, Cima played rugby at the University of Maryland, where he was a teammate to his older brother, Matias. Cima played senior level club rugby for Rocky Gorge in Columbia, Maryland. In January 2018, Cima signed with the San Diego Legion to play in Major League Rugby's inaugural season. Cima currently plays for the Seattle Seawolves.

International career

USA Junior All-Americans
Cima made his debut in international play with the United States men's national under-20 team (Junior All-Americans) in 2014 and played at the 2014 Junior World Rugby Trophy. Cima also represented the United States at the 2016 Junior World Rugby Trophy. From his tenure with the Junior All-Americans, Cima is best-known for kicking a game winning penalty goal, from beyond 50 meters in the eightieth minute of play, in a victory over Canada in a 2016 Junior World Rugby Trophy qualifying match.

USA Selects
In late 2016, Cima made his debut with the USA Selects in the 2016 World Rugby Americas Pacific Challenge. He also represented the United States in the 2017 World Rugby Americas Pacific Challenge, scoring in a defeat to Samoa, and in victories over Uruguay and Canada.

USA Eagles
Cima made his debut with the USA Eagles on February 4, 2017, starting at fly-half in the Eagles' 29–23 victory over Uruguay in the Americas Rugby Championship. Cima scored three penalty goals and one conversion in his debut.

References

1996 births
Living people
American rugby union players
United States international rugby union players
Rugby union fly-halves
New England Free Jacks players
Ohio Aviators players
San Diego Legion players
Seattle Seawolves players